The Seven Ages of Man is a series of paintings by Robert Smirke, derived from the famous monologue beginning all the world's a stage from William Shakespeare's As You Like It, spoken by the melancholy Jaques in Act II Scene VII.  The stages referred are: infant, schoolboy, lover, soldier, justice, pantaloon and old age.

The set of paintings are in pen and ink and oil on panel, and measure: height: 381 mm (15 in); width: 505 mm (19.88 in).  They are now in the Yale Center for British Art, though usually not on display.  In 1796, Robert Smirke agreed to paint William Shakespeare's The Seven Ages of Man for John and Josiah Boydell's Shakespeare Gallery.

Painted between 1798 and 1801, they depict the journey of life in its various forms. They were produced for the Boydell Shakespeare Gallery, and engravings by Peltro William Tomkins, John Ogborne, Robert Thew, Peter Simon the Younger and William Satchwell Leney based on Smirke's paintings were included in the gallery's folio edition of Shakespeare's work.

The monologue 

"All the world's a stage,
And all the men and women merely players.
They have their exits and their entrances,
And one man in his time plays many parts,
His acts being seven ages. At first the infant,
Mewling and puking in the nurse's arms.
Then, the whining school-boy with his satchel
And shining morning face, creeping like snail
Unwillingly to school. And then the lover,
Sighing like furnace, with a woeful ballad
Made to his mistress' eyebrow. Then, a soldier,
Full of strange oaths, and  bearded  like the pard,
Jealous in honour, sudden, and quick in quarrel,
Seeking the bubble reputation
Even in the cannon's mouth. And then, the justice,
In fair round belly, with a good capon lined,
With eyes severe, and beard of formal cut,
Full of wise saws, and modern instances,
And so he plays his part. The sixth age shifts
Into the lean and slippered pantaloon,
With spectacles on nose and pouch on side,
His youthful hose, well saved, a world too wide
For his shrunk shank, and his big manly voice,
Turning again toward childish treble, pipes
And whistles in his sound. Last scene of all,
That ends this strange eventful history,
Is second childishness and mere oblivion,
Sans teeth, sans eyes, sans taste, sans everything."
-Act II, Scene VII, Shakespeare's As You Like It

Descriptions

Infancy 
Just after being born, he is an innocent baby; all the while wailing and crying like a baby.

The Schoolboy 
Here, he begins his schooling; the charms of helpless innocence cease. It is in that stage of life that he begins to go to school. He is unwilling to leave the protected environments of his home as he is still not confident enough to exercise his own discretion.

The Lover 
The lover is depicted as a young man composing his love poems, shown beneath two pictures of Cupid, the god of love and on the left, Romeo-Juliet balcony scene. In this stage, he is always maudlin, expressing his love in a fatuous manner. He makes himself ridiculous in trying to express his feelings. The child in this stage, cares for its beloved the most and is quite concerned about it and is ready to sacrifice its life also to show its affection towards it.

The Soldier 
Here, he is hot-blooded with a high degree of self-respect. He looks forward to gaining a reputation, even if it costs him his life. He is inflamed with the love of war and, like a leopard, he charges. He is very easily aroused and is hot headed. He is always working towards making a reputation for himself, however short-lived it may be, even at the cost of foolish risks.

The Justice 
In this stage he thinks he has acquired wisdom through the many experiences he has had in life and is likely to impart it. He has reached a stage where he has gained prosperity and social status. He becomes vain and begins to enjoy the finer things of life and he attains a socially accepted state and expounds the wisdom he has gained in his life.

The Pantaloon 
He is a shell of his former self — physically and mentally. He begins to become the butt of others' jokes. He loses his firmness and assertiveness, and shrinks in stature and personality and tries to shrink himself into a shell of his worries and is indifferent to his physical appearance and apparel, just as he was in his youth.

Old Age 
In this stage he is dependent on others for care and unable to interact with the world, he experiences "second innocence, and mere oblivion." This stage is also known as second infancy.

See also 
 All the world's a stage
 Jaques
 As You Like It
 Robert Smirke

References 

Attribution

Paintings based on works by William Shakespeare
1800 paintings
English paintings
Collections of the Yale Center for British Art